Albentosa is a municipality located in the province of Teruel, Aragon, Spain. According to the 2007 census (INE), the municipality has a population of 334 inhabitants.

References

External links 
Web page about Albentosa

Municipalities in the Province of Teruel